Alpha Psi Omega National Theatre Honor Society is an American recognition fraternity for participants in collegiate theatre.

History

Alpha Psi Omega was founded after Opp was denied charter petitions by both Theta Alpha Phi (ΘΑΦ), the National Theatre Honors Fraternity and the National Collegiate Players/Pi Epsilon Delta (ΠΕΔ), which were unwilling to charter a chapter at Fairmont State College, then primarily  known as a "teacher's college."  The first student members of the society were Elinor B. Watson and Robert Sloan.

Membership is open to students (primarily undergraduate) who are active in collegiate/university theatre at four-year institutions (full colleges and universities). Most casts/chapters use a "point system" for determining eligibility of membership, with a certain number of points being dealt to a certain task in theatre. With some chapters there is an induction/training process, while other chapters choose members solely on merit, where the theatre experience is considered the induction process.  Honorary membership may be conferred on certain individuals (usually department faculty) after obtaining permission from the National Officers.

Delta Psi Omega
Delta Psi Omega National Theatre Honor Society, Alpha Psi Omega's "Sister Society," was founded in 1929 as the official junior-college division of Alpha Psi Omega.  Both societies are governed by the same National Officers, yet have a separate coat-of-arms and induction ceremony. Delta Psi Omega is founded at two-year institutions (junior colleges/community colleges).

Opp and Alpha Psi Omega were also instrumental in helping to organize the Thespian Society, now known as the International Thespian Society, the theatre honor society for high school students (also founded in 1929).  With an original grant of $500, the society was able to help organize I.T.S. and help publish the first issues of the I.T.S. magazine.  The International Thespian Society has since been assimilated into the Educational Theatre Association, but the influences can be seen in the similarities of both organizations' colors and induction ceremonies.

Members are most commonly referred to as "APOs". However, due to some confusion with members of the national service fraternity Alpha Phi Omega, some campuses refer to their members as "Alpha Psis" or "AYOs". Members of Delta Psi Omega are commonly known as "DPOs".

In 1997, upon pressure of anti-fraternity sentiments nationwide, the National Officers decided to update the public titles of the organization.  This changed the official name of the society from "Alpha Psi Omega National Honorary Dramatic Fraternity" to "Alpha Psi Omega National Theatre Honor Society."

Symbolism and traditions
As was common practice in naming honor societies during that time, at the founding, Alpha Psi Omega was called "Alpha Psi Omega National Honorary Dramatic Fraternity" and used theatre-related terminology to refer to the honor society's officers and workings.  Examples include:
 President/National President – Director / Grand Director
 Vice-President/National Vice-President – Stage Manager / Grand Stage Manager
 Secretary-Treasurer/ National Secretary-Treasurer – Business Manager / Grand Business Manager
 Chapter – Cast
 Inductees – Understudies
 National Officers – Grand Cast
 National Convention – Grand Rehearsal

The open motto of Alpha Psi Omega, written in ancient Greek upon their coat-of-arms, is "seek a life useful" ("αιτειτε ψύχην ωφελιμον").

The official colors of Alpha Psi Omega and Delta Psi Omega are moonlight blue and bastard amber, from the names of the shades of lighting gels commonly used in theatre lighting.

The official magazine of Alpha Psi Omega/Delta Psi Omega is The Playbill.

Alpha Psi Omega/Delta Psi Omega has installed a total of 1,048 chapters, making it one of the largest Greek Letter Organizations in the world.  Chapters of Alpha Psi Omega are named with Greek Letter names according to the order in which they were chartered.  Chapters of Delta Psi Omega use a number system for designation.

Current national officers 

The current national officers of Alpha Psi Omega and Delta Psi Omega are as follows:
National President – Dr. Richard Jones, Stephen F. Austin State University
National Vice-President – Zackary Ross, Bellarmine University
National Business Manager & Editor of Playbill – David Cotter
National Web Administrator – Joel Lord, Rensselaer Polytechnic Institute
Delta Psi Omega Representative – Lisa Coulter, Murray State University

Regional Representatives
 Region I – Brian Reed, Whittier College
 Region II – Jack Garrison, University of Nebraska at Kearney
 Region III – Suzanne Delle, York College of Pennsylvania
 Region IV – Frani Geiger Rollins, Mercer University
 Region V – Brad Nies, Blinn College

Past National Officers of Alpha Psi Omega & Delta Psi Omega
 Dr. E. Teresa Choate – National President, National Vice-President
 Susan S. Cole – National President, National Vice-President
 Tommy Cox – National Acting President, National Vice-President
 Frankie Day – National President, National Vice-President
 James Fisher – National Business Manager
 Donald Garner – National President, National Business Manager
 Phoebe Hall - National Vice-President
 Dr. Jerry Henderson – National President, National Vice-President
Dr. Bret Jones - National Business Manager
 Dr. Yetta Mitchell – National President, National Vice-President
 Dr. Paul F. Opp – Founder, First National Business Manager
 Russell Spiers – First National Vice-President
 E. Turner Stump – First National President

Notable members
Maxwell Anderson (Both Your Houses, High Tor, The Bad Seed)
Dan Blocker (Bonanza)
Jeff Coopwood (Star Trek: First Contact, Beverly Hills, 90210, The Wild Thornberrys, Seinfeld, The Bold and the Beautiful)
Dann Florek (Law & Order, LA Law)
Lillian Gish (Follow Me Boys and a number of silent movies; Broadway revivals of Uncle Vanya)
Ron Glass (Firefly, Serenity)
Robert Hegyes (Welcome Back Kotter)
Don Knotts (The Incredible Mr. Limpet, The Ghost and Mr. Chicken, Pleasantville, The Andy Griffith Show, Three's Company)
Sondra Locke (Willard, The Outlaw Josey Wales, Every Which Way but Loose, Sudden Impact)
Burt Mustin (Miracle on 34th Street, All in the Family, Petticoat Junction, Mame, Leave it to Beaver)
Eugene O'Neill (Playwright, Long Day's Journey into Night, The Iceman Cometh, A Moon for the Misbegotten)
Bill Pullman (Independence Day, Newsies, Spaceballs)
Stelio Savante (Ugly Betty, My Super Ex Girlfriend, What If..., Starship Troopers 3: Marauder, Corrado)  
Jimmi Simpson (Loser, Rose Red)
Dulcé Sloan (The Daily Show, The Great North)
Robert Taylor (Ivanhoe)
Tennessee Williams, American playwright, author of The Glass Menagerie, and A Streetcar Named Desire.

References

External links
Alpha Psi Omega's Official Web site

Student societies in the United States
Honor societies
Theatrical organizations in the United States
Fraternities and sororities in the United States
Student organizations established in 1925
1921 establishments in West Virginia